Rycklon Stephens (born April 22, 1978) is a Guyanese-American retired professional wrestler and bodybuilder. He is best known for his time with WWE under the ring name Ezekiel Jackson, where he was the final ECW Champion under the WWE brand of the same name, and a former Intercontinental Champion. 

Stephens made his professional wrestling debut for the California based promotion Ultimate Pro Wrestling in 2007 under the ring name Big Ryck Hytz. He was then signed by the WWE in 2007 and sent to Florida Championship Wrestling under the new ring name Rycklon which was later changed to Ezekiel Jackson after his main-roster debut in 2008. During his time in WWE, Jackson was the final man to win the ECW Championship making him the third African-American to hold the championship, the sixth black world champion (after The Rock, Booker T, Bobby Lashley, Ron Simmons and Mark Henry) and the only South American-born world champion in WWE history, he later joined The Corre but was kicked out, thus starting a feud with the stable's leader Wade Barrett and he would go on to win the WWE Intercontinental Championship. Jackson would leave WWE in 2014 and briefly wrestle for TNA in the same year. He also competed in one season of Lucha Underground as  Big Ryck from 2014-2015. Ryck would wrestle his last match for Westside Xtreme Wrestling (wxw) in October, 2015.  He is the owner of the Redwood City, California-based professional wrestling promotion and school Bryckhouse Pro Wrestling. In total, Jackson was a one-time world champion in professional wrestling.

Early life 
Stephens attended the University at Buffalo.

Professional wrestling career

World Wrestling Entertainment/WWE

Florida Championship Wrestling (2007–2008) 

Stephens signed a developmental contract with World Wrestling Entertainment in March 2007 and debuted in Florida Championship Wrestling (FCW) in late June. In his debut match on June 27, he teamed with Keith Walker to defeat Kofi Kingston and Eric Pérez. He continued to compete in the promotion in both tag team and singles matches. On February 8, 2008 he competed in a match with tag partner Bryan Kelly in a losing effort against Steve Lewington and Heath Miller in a mini-tournament to face the WWE Tag Team Champions John Morrison and The Miz. On May 6, 2008, Stephens wrestled his final match in FCW before being called up to WWE's main roster.

The Brian Kendrick's bodyguard (2008–2009) 

After being trained in FCW, Stephens debuted on the July 18, 2008 episode of SmackDown under the name Ezekiel, as The Brian Kendrick's bodyguard. On the August 8, 2008 edition of SmackDown, his ring name was tweaked to Ezekiel Jackson, and he was revealed as being Kendrick's "advisor". He then began interfering in Kendrick's matches against Jeff Hardy, Finlay, and WWE Champion Triple H. On the October 17 episode of SmackDown, Jackson made his official in-ring debut by quickly defeating Super Crazy, after replacing a supposedly sick Kendrick. In late 2008, Jackson began teaming with Kendrick and both began feuding with the WWE Tag Team Champions The Colóns (Carlito and Primo), although Kendrick and Jackson failed to win the championship. He suffered his first defeat on the February 13, 2009 episode of SmackDown, when he lost a singles match to R-Truth. Jackson made his final appearance on the SmackDown brand in a losing effort against Jeff Hardy on the April 3, 2009 episode.

The Ruthless Roundtable and ECW Champion (2009–2010) 
On April 15, 2009, Jackson was drafted to the ECW brand as part of the 2009 Supplemental Draft, therefore breaking up the team of himself and Kendrick. He made his ECW debut defeating Jack Meridol on the July 9, 2009 episode. Jackson then began an angle with Vladimir Kozlov in which, week after week, after one of them had squashed a local competitor, the other would come out and hit their finishing move on the fallen opponent in a game of one-upmanship. On the August 18 episode of ECW, Jackson formed an alliance with Kozlov and William Regal after betraying the ECW Champion, Christian, during a tag team match to side with them, and attacking Christian at Regal's request. Kozlov and Jackson aided Regal in his feud with Christian over the ECW Championship, but Regal was unable to capture the title.

On the November 24 episode of ECW, Jackson attacked both Regal and Kozlov after Kozlov accused Jackson of costing Regal a match. The following week, Jackson once again betrayed Kozlov and Regal by walking out on Kozlov during a tag team match against Christian and Shelton Benjamin. Jackson, however, realigned himself with Regal, when he was aided by Regal in defeating Kozlov on an episode of ECW. On the January 12, 2010 episode of ECW, Jackson won the ECW Homecoming battle royal to earn a match for the ECW Championship. He faced Christian for the ECW championship at the Royal Rumble pay-per-view but was unsuccessful. On the final episode of ECW on February 16, Jackson defeated Christian to win the ECW Championship in an Extreme Rules match. Upon winning the title, WWE credits Jackson as the final ECW Champion.

The Corre and Intercontinental Champion (2010–2011) 

On the February 19 episode of SmackDown, a video package aired, promoting Jackson's return to the brand. He made his return on the March 5 episode of SmackDown without Regal, who instead joined Raw, and defeated Jimmy Wang Yang. On April 10, 2010 at a house show in Glasgow, Scotland, Jackson suffered a tear in his right quadriceps muscle during a match against Kane, and was expected to be inactive for approximately six months. During his injury, Jackson was drafted to the Raw brand as part of the 2010 WWE Supplemental Draft.

Jackson made his return to the ring on September 13, 2010, defeating Zack Ryder in a dark match prior to the Raw tapings.  He returned to television on the October 18 episode of Raw, where he was revealed as a member of Team Raw for the Bragging Rights pay-per-view. At Bragging Rights, Jackson was one of the final two remaining members of Team Raw, but they lost to Team SmackDown. On the November 22 episode of Raw, Jackson qualified for the 2010 edition of the King of the Ring tournament by defeating Alex Riley, who replaced Jackson's original opponent The Miz. He faced Drew McIntyre in the quarter-finals, but the match ended in a double countout, so neither advanced.

In December 2010, Jackson was traded back to the SmackDown brand. On the January 11, 2011, taping of the January 14 edition of SmackDown, Jackson joined Wade Barrett, Justin Gabriel and Heath Slater in assaulting The Big Show, appearing to form an alliance with the three.   The following week the group was named The Corre. On the May 6 episode of SmackDown, Jackson defeated Big Show in a singles match, but refused to celebrate with the other members of The Corre afterward. Backstage, the other members of The Corre attacked him in retaliation, turning Jackson face.
Jackson went on to face Barrett for the Intercontinental Championship at Over the Limit, and won by disqualification, which meant that Barrett retained the championship. Jackson continued to feud with the other members of The Corre, winning against Barrett by disqualification and countout respectively.

On June 19, at the Capitol Punishment pay-per-view, Jackson defeated Barrett to win the Intercontinental Championship for the first time. Jackson successfully retained the championship in a rematch against Barrett on the following episode of SmackDown and also successfully defended it against Ted DiBiase on the July 15 episode. On August 12 episode of SmackDown, Jackson lost the Intercontinental Championship to Cody Rhodes, ending his Intercontinental Championship reign at 51 days. He went on to feud with both Rhodes and DiBiase. On the August 19 episode of SmackDown, he lost a rematch for the championship to Rhodes. Jackson was part of a ten-man battle royal for the Intercontinental Championship, but was eliminated by Rhodes.

Final feuds and departure (2012–2014) 
On January 29, 2012 at the Royal Rumble pay-per-view, Jackson entered the Royal Rumble match as the thirteenth entrant, but he was eliminated by the returning Great Khali. Jackson started a losing streak losing to the likes of Jinder Mahal, Drew McIntyre, and David Otunga. Jackson finally ended his losing streak by teaming with The Great Khali to defeat the team of Curt Hawkins and Tyler Reks on the May 16 episode of NXT. However, he lost to the Big Show on the May 26 episode and May 27 episode of Smackdown.

Around mid–2012, Jackson suffered an upper body injury and was inactive for many months. After almost a year of inactivity due to his injury, Jackson returned at a live event for WrestleMania Axxess on April 4, 2013 by teaming up with Yoshi Tatsu to defeat the team of Hunico and Camacho. On January 4, 2014, Jackson announced he was undergoing another surgery. As a result of this, on April 6, 2014, Jackson reported that he had officially parted ways with the WWE.

Total Nonstop Action Wrestling (2014) 
He made his debut, along with Gene Snitsky, in TNA on the June 25 taping of Impact Wrestling (which aired on July 24) using the ringname Rycklon as a heel; attacking Tommy Dreamer, Bully Ray and Devon, and aligning himself with Dixie Carter. It also marked the very first time that the final champion of the original and the new ECW were in the ring at exactly the same time (Rhino and Rycklon) Rycklon and Snitsky were fired by Dixie Carter on the August 7 edition of Impact Wrestling. Earlier on the show they had competed in an Eight-Man Hardcore War between Team EC3 (EC3, Rhino, Rycklon and Snitsky) in a losing effort against Team Bully (Bully Ray, Devon, Tommy Dreamer and Al Snow).

Lucha Underground (2014–2015) 
In September 2014, Stephens worked at Lucha Underground under the ring name Big Ryck, where he was forming a heel trio named The Crenshaw Crew with Cisco, Bael and Cortez Castro. Ryck feuded with Johnny Mundo and Prince Puma. Their feud concluded in a three-way ladder match, which was won by Mundo. On the October 5, 2014 taping, Ryck participated in an Aztec Warfare Battle Royal to crown the first Lucha Underground Champion but was eliminated. On January 21, 2015, Cisco, Castro and Bael attacked Ryck and burned his eye with a cigar, turning face in the process. Ryck returned to action on February 25, 2015, distracting The Crew in a match against Sexy Star, Mascarita Sagrada, and Pimpinela Escarlata. On March 4, 2015, Ryck defeated Star to earn a match against The Crew. Ryck defeated The Crew in a one-on-three handicap match. On February 8, 2015, Ryck, along with Killshot and Willie Mack participated in a tournament for the Lucha Underground Trios Championship, but they were defeated in the finals by the eventual winners Angélico, Son of Havoc and Ivelisse. After their loss, Ryck left Mack and Killshot and was hired by DelAvar Daivari, attacking Texano on May 20, 2015, turning heel in the process. At Ultima Lucha, Daivari ran out and distracted Ryck by firing him, hinting at a face turn. However, nothing came of this due to Stephens departing Lucha Underground in 2015 due to traveling conflicts. It was revealed that Big Ryck was one of five missing people on the April 20 episode of Lucha Underground. In the four issue mini series following that, it explaining what had happened after Ultima Lucha and before season two. It was revealed that Ryck was "killed" by The Disciples of Death, officially writing his character off the show.

International promotions and retirement (2015) 
On October 17, 2015, Stephens, as Big Ryck, made his debut for the German Westside Xtreme Wrestling (wXw) promotion, in what was also his last match. He unsuccessfully challenged Karsten Beck for the wXw Unified World Wrestling Championship. Stephens retired from professional wrestling on October 18, 2015, and is now working as a trainer as of 2016.

Personal life 
Stephens has been married to his wife Jenn Stephens since 2004. Stephens is a devout Christian.

Championships and accomplishments 
 Pro Wrestling Illustrated
 PWI ranked him No. 78 of the top 500 singles wrestlers in the PWI 500 in 2011
 World Wrestling Entertainment/WWE
 ECW Championship (1 time, final)
 WWE Intercontinental Championship (1 time)
 ECW Homecoming Tournament (2010)

References

External links 

 
 
 
 

1978 births
Afro-Guyanese people
American male professional wrestlers
ECW Heavyweight Champions/ECW World Heavyweight Champions
Guyanese professional wrestlers
Living people
University at Buffalo alumni
WWF/WWE Intercontinental Champions
Guyanese Christians
People from Linden, Guyana
21st-century professional wrestlers